A (bipedal) gait cycle is the time period or sequence of events or movements during locomotion in which one foot contacts the ground to when that same foot again contacts the ground, and involves propulsion of the centre of gravity in the direction of motion. A gait cycle usually involves co-operative movements of both the left and right legs and feet. A single gait cycle is also known as a stride.

Each gait cycle or stride has two major phases:
 Stance Phase, the phase during which the foot remains in contact with the ground, and the
 Swing Phase, the phase during which the foot is not in contact with the ground.

Components of gait cycle

A gait cycle consists of stance phase and swing phase. Considering the number of limb supports, the stance phase spans from initial double-limb stance to single-limb stance and terminal double-limb stance. The swing phase corresponds to the single-limb stance of the opposite leg. The stance and swing phases can further be divided by seven events into seven smaller phases in which the body postures are specific.  For analyzing gait cycle one foot is taken as reference and the movements of the reference foot are studied.

Phases and events
Stance Phase: Stance phase is that part of a gait cycle during which the foot remains in contact with the ground.  It constitutes 60% of the gait cycle (10% for initial double-limb stance, 40% for single-limb stance and 10% for terminal double-limb stance). Stance phase consists of four events and four phases:
 Initial Contact (Heel Strike): The heel of the reference foot touches the ground in front of the body. The respective knee is extended while the hip is extending from flexed position, bringing the torso to the lowest vertical position. This event marks the initiation of stance phase.
 Loading Response (Foot Flat) Phase: Loading response phase begins immediately after the heel strikes the ground. In loading response phase, the weight is transferred onto the referenced leg. It is important for weight-bearing, shock-absorption and forward progression.
 Opposite Toe-off: The toes of the opposite foot are raised above the ground as the foot begins to hover forward. This event terminates the period of double-limb support.
 Mid-stance Phase: It involves alignment and balancing of body weight on the reference foot regarding single-limb support. The respective knee flexes while the hip is extending, bringing the torso to the highest vertical position. The center of gravity moves laterally to the supporting-limb side. During mid-stance phase the reference foot contact the ground flat-footed.
 Heel Rise: The heel of the reference foot rises while the toes are still in contact with the ground. This event marks the end of mid-stance phase and the beginning of terminal stance phase.
 Terminal Stance Phase: In this phase the heel of reference foot continues to rise while its toes are still in contact with the ground. The center of gravity is in front of the foot.
 Opposite Initial Contact: The heel of the opposite foot contact the ground while the toes of the reference foot still touch the ground, providing double support. The knee and hip on the reference side are extended. The torso moves to the lowest vertical position.
 Pre-swing Phase: This phase corresponds to the loading response phase of the opposite foot. The center of gravity moves to the opposite side.

Swing Phase: Swing phase is that part of the gait cycle during which the reference  foot is not in contact with the ground and swings in the air. It constitutes about 40% of gait cycle. It can be separated by three events into three phases:
 Toe-off: The toes of reference foot rise above the ground. Flexion of the respective knee and hip is initiated as the foot prepares to swing in air. This event is the beginning of the swing phase of the gait cycle. The body weight is single-supported by the opposite foot.
 Initial Swing Phase: The reference foot moves forward towards the opposite foot, while the knee and the hip are flexing. The body trunk moves laterally to the supporting side.
 Feet adjacent: The reference foot hovers above the ground adjacent to the opposite foot. The knee is most flexed while the torso moves to the highest vertical position.
 Mid-swing Phase: This phase is marked by feet adjacent event. The reference foot moves forward and eventually surpasses the supporting foot while the respective hip continues flexion.
 Tibial Vertical: The hip on the reference side is at its most flexed position in the gait. The orientation of respective tibia is approximately perpendicular to the ground. The event is regarded as the end of mid-swing phase.
 Terminal Swing Phase: During terminal swing phase, the reference foot begins landing to the ground as the respective knee and hip begin extension. The torso surpasses the supporting foot and moves downward.

Support
 Single support: In single support only one foot is in contact with the ground.
 Double support: In double support both feet are in contact with the ground. Double support occurs from heel strike, continues during loading response phase, until the toes of the opposite foot rise off the ground.

Terminology
 Step Length: It is defined as the distance between corresponding successive points of heel contact of the opposite feet. In a normal gait, the right  step length is equal to left step length.
 Stride Length: It is defined as the distance between any two successive points of heel contact of the same foot. In a normal gait, the stride length is double the step length.
 Walking Base or Stride Width: It is defined as the side-to-side distance between the line of step of the two feet. 
In normal gait, cadence is about 100–115 steps per minute. Cadence of a person is subject to various factors.
 Comfortable Walking Speed: It is a characteristic speed at which there is least energy consumption per unit distance. It is about 80 meters per minute in a normal gait.

References

External links

Medschool.lsuhsc.edu
Kau.edu.sa

Walking
Biomechanics